Tupi, officially the Municipality of Tupi (Jawi: ايڠايد نو توڤي), is a 1st class municipality in the province of South Cotabato, Philippines. According to the 2020 census, it has a population of 73,459 people.

Nestled at the foot of a dormant volcano, Mount Matutum, Tupi is considered as the fruit, vegetable and flower basket of South Cotabato.

History

Tupi derived from the word "Tufi" which was a vine chewed by native Blaan tribes who first inhabited the land. Tufi was abundant in the original forests and had a refreshing taste.

As it lies in the dormant foot of Mt. Matutum, Tupi's fertile soil of volcanic ash offers a great enticement to speculators and investors particularly in the field of agriculture.

In 1936 during the commonwealth government, President Manuel L. Quezon appointed Major General Paulino Santos as General Manager for the development of Koronadal and the vast land in the Allah Valley. Settlers from Luzon and the Visayas starting to arrive transforming the once large forest into a flourishing area of agriculture.

The Bario of Tupi was created into a municipality of Tupi by virtue of executive order 612 of President Elpidio Quirino on September 11, 1953. The first set of appointed officials were inducted on October 2 of that year.

Geography

Barangays
Tupi is politically subdivided into 15 barangays:

Climate

Demographics

Economy

Tupi's climate and soil type makes it suitable to all types of crop and livestock production. Tupi aside from pineapple, tropical fruits and vegetables is identified as suited for high-value commercial crops (HVCC) like asparagus and papaya. Cutflower production is one crop that is putting Tupi on the regional map. Tupi is likewise identified as one of the areas in the province well suited for poultry production. To date, there are around 34 major poultry raisers scattered in the municipality with minimum of 10,000 heads capacity. Tupi had been identified in the Soccsksargen Growth Plan as one of the areas where a satellite Food Terminal shall be located. To date, a private organization, the DARBCI initiated the establishment of an initial 70 hectare Economic Zone within the Municipality of Tupi. One of the future investment eyed as an economic booster is the establishment of an Integrated Food Terminal. On this aspect, private investors are welcome to finance major economic endeavors within the economic zone.

Tupi, which is basically an agricultural municipality, devotes 19% of its total land area to agricultural production. Major agricultural crops are pineapple, papaya, asparagus, fruits, vegetables, corn, coffee, bananas, cut-flowers. Other high value commercial products include wood products and processed food.

The exports products are pineapple, asparagus, bottled fruit preserves, and Bongolan Banana.

The existing major business establishments are Progressive Farms, Kablon Farms, Stanfilco of Dole Philippines, Blooming Petals, Inc., Eden's Flowers, Central Universal Corporation and other large scale livestock and poultry raisers distributed all over the municipality.

Arts and culture
Kasadyahan Festival, "Sagana Sayaw sa Kadalanan-Kasadyahan": Celebration featuring street dancing competition coined from Visayan word "Kasadya". It is a convergence of various ethnic and cultural dances featuring Tupi as the province's flower, fruit and vegetable basket and a town where various cultures abode. Held every September 11 in celebration of the town's foundation anniversary.
Linggo ng Matutum: A weeklong festivity every March 13–20 of each year in celebration of the declaration of Mt. Matutum as protected Landscape: highlighting "Amyak Maleh", a climb and plant mountaineering activities and the Mindanao wide "Amyak Maleh Mt Matutum Bike Challenge". 
Kariton Festival: Annual parade of animal-drawn carts (kariton) bedecked with vegetables, fruits and flowers. Held every October and is being sponsored by the barangay Poblacion. 
Ati-Atihan: A yearly festival of Barangay Crossing Rubber same with that of Kalibo, Aklan.

Infrastructure

Transportation
The Tupi Transport Terminal has its daily trip to General Santos and Koronadal City 24 hours daily. The estimated time allotment from Tupi to General Santos and vice versa is only 45~60 minutes without traffic. From General Santos, there are trips to Tupi, the PUVs are available at the mall terminals.

General Santos International Airport is 1 hour away from Tupi's town proper by using the newly constructed General Santos Diversion Road to avoid heavy traffic in General Santos.

Communications
The Philippine Long Distance Telephone Company provides fixed line services. Wireless mobile communications services are provided by Smart Communications and Globe Telecommunications.

References

External links
 Tupi Profile at PhilAtlas.com
 
 Tupi Profile at the DTI Cities and Municipalities Competitive Index
 [ Philippine Standard Geographic Code]
Philippine Census Information

Municipalities of South Cotabato
Populated places established in 1953
Establishments by Philippine executive order